The Insular Life Assurance Company, Ltd. (commonly known by its trade name, Insular Life, and shortened as InLife) is a mutual life insurance company in the Philippines. Established on November 25, 1910 in Manila, it is the first Filipino life insurance company. The company offers individual and group life, health, education and retirement insurance plans. It provides allied financial services such as general insurance, banking, healthcare, lending and investment through subsidiaries and affiliate companies in its eponymous corporate group. Insular Life was once a member of the Ayala Corporation until 1987, when it became a mutual company owned by its policyholders. Its Executive Chairman of the Board is Nina D. Aguas and its Chief Executive Officer is Raoul Antonio E. Littaua. As of 2020, it is the tenth largest life insurer in the Philippines in terms of premium income, and fourth in terms of net worth.

History 
The firm was established as the first domestic life insurance company in the Philippines with Antonio Ma. Barretto as its founding President. Its first headquarters were located at the Lack and Davies Building in Manila's Echague district. In 1934, it inaugurated its first building in Binondo, Manila. Insular Life established an overseas branch in Honolulu in 1934, and its first district office in Cebu City in 1938. During the Second World War, the company continued operations and took over the business of the Filipinas Life Assurance Company. The Philippines business of the Occidental Life Insurance Company of California was acquired by the company in 1954. A few years later in 1958, it introduced industrial life insurance in the Philippines.

Office Buildings

Muntinlupa 
It is currently headquartered at the Insular Life Corporate Centre (ILCC) building in Filinvest City, Alabang, Muntinlupa. Designed by the Japanese firm, Takenobu Mohri Architects and Associates, the ILCC was inaugurated in 2001. The building is a two-tower structure connected by a podium, which houses a 500-seat auditorium.

Makati 
Previously, it held its main corporate offices at the Insular Life Building in Makati. That building was built in 1962 and was the first to surpass the 30 meter height restriction in the Philippines. It had a gently curving façade entirely covered by narrow vertical aluminium projections that were set close together within square modules to conceal the curtain wall behind it. Originally designed by Cesar Concio, the building was controversially redeveloped in 2005 with a design by Takenobu Mohri Architects and Associates, and again in 2015 by Casas Architects.

Cebu City 
It also maintains a corporate building at the Cebu Business Park designed by Jose Mañosa.

Corporate Group

The members of the Insular group of companies as of 2020 are:

Holding Company
The Insular Life Assurance Company, Ltd. (Life Insurance underwriting)
Subsidiaries
Insular Health Care, Inc. (Health/HMO)
Insular Investment Corporation (Investment banking)
Insular Life Management and Development Corporation (Management services)
ILAC General Insurance Agency (General agency)

Affiliates
Mapfre Insular Insurance (Non-life Insurance underwriting)
Maria Health (Health/HMO marketing)
PPI Prime Venture (Real estate)
Union Bank of the Philippines (Universal banking and Bancassurance partner)

Social Commitment
Insular Foundation
Former Subsidiaries and Affiliates
Hawaiian Life Insurance Company (Until 1955, acquired by the American General Life Insurance Company)
Insular Savings Bank (Until 2005, acquired by Citibank Philippines)
HomeCredit Mutual Building and Loan Association

References

Financial services companies established in 1910
Mutual insurance companies
Companies based in Muntinlupa
Life insurance companies of the Philippines